Shamqoluy-e Sofla (also Romanized as Shāmqolūy-e Soflá; also known as Shāh‘olū-ye Soflá, Shāmeqlū, Shāmgholū-ye Soflá, Shāmqolī-ye Soflá, and Shāmqolū-ye Soflá) is a village in Yekanat Rural District, Yamchi District, Marand County, East Azerbaijan Province, Iran. At the 2006 census, its population was 40, in 7 families. The majority of villagers had migrated to Iranian cities Shiraz, Ormiye, Tabriz, Khoy and Marand respectively.

References 

Populated places in Marand County